Preben Neergaard (2 May 1920 – 22 July 1990) was a Danish stage and film actor.

Filmography

Ungdommens rus - 1943
Vredens dag - 1943
Teatertosset - 1944
Elly Petersen - 1944
De røde enge - 1945
Diskret ophold - 1946
Ditte Menneskebarn - 1946
Far betaler - 1946
De pokkers unger - 1947
 The Swedenhielm Family - 1947
Mani - 1947
Kristinus Bergman - 1948
Støt står den danske sømand - 1948
Det hændte i København - 1949
Susanne - 1950
Historien om Hjortholm - 1950
Fodboldpræsten - 1951
Dorte - 1951
 The Crime of Tove Andersen (1953)
Solstik - 1953
Far til fire i sneen - 1954
Hvad vil De ha'? - 1956
Lån mig din kone - 1957
Pigen i søgelyset - 1959
Paw - 1959
Gymnasiepigen - 1960
Den sidste vinter - 1960
Den hvide hingst - 1961
Hvad med os? - 1963
Slottet - 1964
Fem mand og Rosa - 1964
Mennesker mødes og sød musik opstår i hjertet - 1967
Dage i min fars hus - 1968
Manden der tænkte ting - 1969
Mordskab - 1969
Kun sandheden - 1975
Hør, var der ikke en som lo? - 1978
Suzanne og Leonard - 1984
Peter von Scholten - 1987

External links 

 Preben Neergaard at Danskefilm.dk

Danish male stage actors
Danish male film actors
20th-century Danish male actors
1920 births
1990 deaths
People from Furesø Municipality